Tegulinus is a genus of dwarf spiders first described by A. V. Tanasevitch in 2017.

Species
 it contains two species.
Tegulinus bifurcatus Tanasevitch, 2017 — Indonesia (Sumatra)
Tegulinus sumatranus Tanasevitch, 2017 — Indonesia (Sumatra)

References

External links

Araneomorphae genera
Linyphiidae